Loher, Löher or Loeher may refer to:

People
 Aloys Loeher (1850–1904), American sculptor
 Dea Loher (born 1964), German author
 Franz von Löher (1818–1892), German historian

Places
 Loher Cashel, cashel in Ireland

See also
 Lohr (disambiguation)